Christos Marinos (born 1989) is a Greek professional basketball player. At a height of 1.86 m (6' 1") tall, he plays at the point guard position.

References

External links
EuroBasket.com Profile
ProBallers.com Profile

1989 births
Living people
Greek men's basketball players
Greek Basket League players
AEK B.C. players
Aigaleo B.C. players
Pagrati B.C. players
Peristeri B.C. players
Point guards